Carlos Alberto Scolari (born 1963 Rosario, Argentina) is a researcher and expert in communication and digital media, interfaces and communication ecology. 
Building on the tradition of the theories of mass media, since 1990, he has been dedicated to studying new forms of communication arising from the spread of the World Wide Web.

Life
He has taught at the National University of Rosario, the University of Vic from 2002 to 2009, the Pompeu Fabra University from 2010 to 2014, and the Università Cattolica di Milano.

He has been visiting professor, lecturer and organizer of workshops at universities in Argentina, Brazil, Colombia, Mexico, United States, Canada, Portugal, Switzerland, Italy, UK, France, Belgium, Finland, Poland, Austria and Estonia.

His most outstanding scientific contributions have been in the fields of semiotics of interfaces and interaction processes, where he integrated the semiotic models of Umberto Eco and Algirdas Greimas with the cognitive theories of Donald Norman, Marvin Minsky and Francisco Varela and theories of interactive digital media, where his main references are Jesus Martin-Barbero, Alejandro Piscitelli, Marshall McLuhan, Robert K. Logan or Lev Manovich. 
In recent years he has taken up the study of speech television and transmedia narratives in the theoretical context of media ecology (Media Ecology).

He has lived in Europe since 1990, and currently resides in Spain.

Bibliography

References

External links

HIPERMEDIACIONES, 
Carlos A. Scolari, Scribd
https://modernclicks.wordpress.com/
"This is a fascinating time to be studying and working in communication" UOC, June 2013, Jordi Rovira

1963 births
Living people
People from Rosario, Santa Fe
Academic staff of Pompeu Fabra University
Academic staff of the National University of Rosario